José Luis Rodríguez Menéndez ( 11 May 1910 in Mieres, Asturias – 21 March 1990 in Burgos), better known as Luisín, was a Spanish football striker and manager.
In a 10-season professional career, between 1927 and 1941, he played for Caudal de Mieres, Club Deportivo Logroño, Real Oviedo and Sevilla FC.
He also played for Asturias and Gipúzcoa and he was even preselected by the Spain national football team before 1934 FIFA World Cup.

As a manager, he coached Club Deportivo Logrones, Deportivo Maestranza Aérea, Logroño Recreación Club and Caudal Deportivo.

External links
BDFutbol Profile

References

Spanish footballers
1910 births
1990 deaths
Association football forwards